Johnie is a masculine given name. Notable people with the name include:

 Johnie Berntsson (born 1972), Swedish sport sailor
Johnie Cock, protagonist of the eponymous Scottish folk ballad
Johnie Cooks (born 1958), American football player
Johnie Hammond (born 1932), American politician in Iowa
 Johnie Scot, protagonist of the eponymous English/Scottish ballad
Johnie Watson (1896–1958), American baseball outfielder

See also

 John (given name)
 Johnn
 Johnny (given name)
 Johny (disambiguation)
 Jonathan (name)
 Joni (disambiguation)
 Jonie
 Jonn
 Jonni
 Jonnie
 Jony

Masculine given names